A Place Called Love is the sixth studio album by Canadian country music artist Johnny Reid. It was released on August 31, 2010 by EMI Records.

Singles
The first single, "Today I'm Gonna Try and Change the World," peaked at number 41 on the Canadian Hot 100, Reid's highest single peak to date. The album's second single, "Let's Go Higher," peaked at number 58.

Commercial performance
The album peaked at number 1 on the Canadian Albums Chart and stayed at number 1 for four weeks, the second longest streak for 2010, with Eminem's album Recovery being the longest staying at seven weeks at number 1. The album sold 31,000 copies in its first week, and has since sold 96,700 copies. The album was certified double platinum by the CRIA on November 2010 with an excess of 160,000 copies.

Track listing

Personnel 

Roy Agee – trombone
Eddie Bayers – drums
Richard Bennett – bouzouki, electric guitar
Kevin Dailey – assistant, engineer
Derrik Lee – background vocals
Everett Drake – background vocals
Jim Drury – bagpipes
Dan Dugmore – pedal steel guitar
Gareth Dunlop – vocal group
Steve Fischel;– trumpet
Vicki Hampton – vocal group, background vocals
Kyle Harris – background vocals
Steve Herman – trumpet
John Hinchey – trombone
Jim Hoke – horn arrangements, baritone saxophone
John Barlow Jarvis – fender rhodes, organ, piano, vocal group
Sam Levine – horn arrangements, alto saxophone, baritone sax, tenor saxophone
Ken Love – mastering
Brent Maher – engineer, horn arrangements, mixing, producer, vocal group
Brian Maher – vocal group
Margaret Malandruccolo – photography
Brent Mason – acoustic guitar, electric guitar
Antoine Moonen – graphic design
Gordon Mote – organ
The Nashville String Machine – Strings
Sierra Noble – vocal group
Steve Patrick – trumpet
Chris Patterson – Steel drums
Shandra Penix – background vocals
Johnny Reid – lead vocals
Michael Rhodes – bass guitar
Tammy Rogers – fiddle
Mark Selby – acoustic guitar, classical guitar, electric guitar
Steve Sheehan – acoustic guitar
Troy Taylor – background vocals
Ilya Toshinsky – acoustic guitar, electric guitar, ukulele
Bergen White – string arrangements
Glenn Worf – bass guitar
Charles Yingling – engineer, mixing
Nir Z. – drums, percussion, drum programming

Chart performance

Album

Singles

Year-end charts

Certifications

References

2010 albums
Johnny Reid albums
EMI Records albums
Albums produced by Brent Maher
Canadian Country Music Association Top Selling Canadian Album albums
Juno Award for Country Album of the Year albums